The Səbail FK 2017-18 season was Səbail's first Azerbaijan Premier League season, and their second season in existence.

Squad

Out on loan

Transfers

Summer

In:

Out:

Winter

In:

Out:

Released

Friendlies

Competitions

Overview

Premier League

Results summary

Results

League table

Azerbaijan Cup

Squad Statistics

Appearances and goals

|-
|colspan="14"|Players away on loan:

|-
|colspan="14"|Players who left Səbail during the season:

|}

Goal scorers

Clean sheets

Disciplinary Record

References

Azerbaijani football clubs 2017–18 season